Major water reservoirs and dams in Poland:

 Besko Reservoir on the Wisłok, completed 1978
 Bukowskie Reservoir on the Bóbr, completed 1907, expanded 1989
 Lake Czorsztyn on the Dunajec, completed 1995
 Lake Dobczyce on the Raba, 1987
 Goczałkowice Reservoir on the Vistula, 1956
 Lake Klimkowskie on the Ropa, 1994
 Lake Leśnia on the Kwisa, 1905
 Lake Lubachowskie on the Bystrzyca, 1917
 Lake Malta on the Cybina, 1952
 Lake Międzybrodzkie, created by the Porąbka Dam on the Soła, 1937
 Niedów Reservoir on the Smědá, 1962
 Nyskie Lake on the Nysa Kłodzka, 1971
 Otmuchowskie Reservoir on the Nysa Kłodzka, 1933
 Pilchowickie Lake, created by the masonry gravity Pilchowice Dam on the Bóbr, 1912
 Lake Rożnów on the Dunajec, 1942
 Lake Solina, created by the concrete gravity Solina Dam on the San, 1968
 Sulejów Reservoir on the Pilica, 1974
 Włocławek Reservoir on the Vistula, 1970
 Wrzeszczyńskie Reservoir on the Bóbr, 1927
 Zegrze Reservoir on the Narew, 1963
 Złotnickie Reservoir, created by the masonry gravity Złotnickie Dam on the Kwisa, 1924
 Zygmunt August's Lake near Knyszyn, 1559 - oldest in Poland
 Żywiec Lake on the Soła, 1966
 unnamed reservoir at Świnna Poręba on the Skawa, under construction as of 2014

See also
 List of reservoirs and dams

Poland, Dams and reservoirs

Dams
Dams